Circe is a 1677 tragedy by the English writer Charles Davenant. It was first staged by the Duke's Company at the Dorset Garden Theatre in London. The play's music was composed by John Banister.

The original cast included Thomas Betterton as Orestes, Joseph Williams as Pylades, William Smith as Ithacus, Henry Harris as Thoas, Mary Lee as Circe and Mary Betterton as  Iphigenia.

References

Bibliography
 Van Lennep, W. The London Stage, 1660-1800: Volume One, 1660-1700. Southern Illinois University Press, 1960.

1677 plays
English plays
West End plays
Tragedy plays